Daisy Lake may refer to the following Canadian lakes:

Daisy Lake (British Columbia)
Daisy Lake (Northwest Territories)
Daisy Lake (Algoma District), Ontario
Daisy Lake (Greater Sudbury), Ontario
Daisy Lake (Nipissing District), Ontario
Daisy Lake (Thunder Bay District), Ontario

See also
Lake Daisy (Florida)